Chilelimnophila is a genus of crane fly in the family Limoniidae. There is only one known species.

Distribution
This genus, and single species, is found only in Chile.

Species
L. lyra Alexander, 1952

References

Limoniidae
Diptera of South America
Nematocera genera
Endemic fauna of Chile